The SX-ACE is a vector NEC SX supercomputer from NEC Corporation. It features NEC's first multi-core vector System on a Chip design, with four cores. The SX-ACE runs at 1 GHz, has peak performance of 64 GFLOPS per core, and has 64 gigabytes per second of memory bandwidth per core. Four cores make up a shared-memory node, and 64 nodes can fit in a rack for a total performance of 16 TFLOPS per rack. The SX-ACE was released in 2013. NEC released the successor, the SX-Aurora TSUBASA in 2017. It is used by Earth Simulator 3.

See also
SUPER-UX
SX architecture

References

External links
SX-10 announcement press release
Japanese interview discussing the SX-10
Main English-language SX-ACE site

SX-ACE
Vector supercomputers